Lions and Ladies is a 1919 American comedy film featuring Oliver Hardy.

Cast
 Oliver Hardy (as Babe Hardy)
 Harry Mann
 Rosa Gore
 Bobby Dunn

See also
 List of American films of 1919
 Oliver Hardy filmography

External links

1919 films
1919 comedy films
Silent American comedy films
American black-and-white films
Films directed by Frank Griffin
1919 short films
American silent short films
American comedy short films
1910s American films